Hyposmocoma pritchardiae is a species of moth of the family Cosmopterigidae. It was first described by Otto Swezey in 1933. It is endemic to the Hawaiian island of Kauai. The type locality is Kumuwela.

The larvae feed on Pritchardia eriophora. The larvae were found feeding in the abundant fulvous cottony tomentum of the host plant, with which the spathe and other parts of inflorescence is clothed. The moths are about the colour of this cottony substance.

References

External links

pritchardiae
Endemic moths of Hawaii
Moths described in 1933